7:35 in the Morning is a 2003 Spanish short film directed and written by Nacho Vigalondo.

Plot
The film is an eight-minute long black and white short that depicts a Spanish woman encountering a strange singing man in a coffee shop one morning. The strange man turns out to be a suicide bomber, who professes his love through the words of the song to a woman who turns up every day at 7:35 in the morning (de la mañana). The others in the cafe have prerecorded lines to say at points during the song (or they risk the threat of being blown up) and even a short dance routine.

At the start of the film, the woman realises that something is not right when sitting down: everyone is quiet and refusing to acknowledge her presence. When the man reveals himself to be a suicide bomber (one of the people in the cafe refuses to sing), she calls the police (whilst he is not watching). Roughly three minutes later, the police arrive outside the coffee shop. The man finishes his song and emerges from the cafe to the police, holding a big sack of confetti. The man blows himself up, and the confetti showers over the woman. The credits roll.

Cast
Marta Belenguer  as Mujer
Nacho Vigalondo as Tipo
Antonio Tato  as Luis / Camarero
Borja Cobeaga as Ayte. Camarero 1
Javier Reguilón  as Ayte. Camarero 2
Alejandro Garrido  as Cliente Barra
César Velasco  as Cliente 1
Esperanza Palacios  as Cliente 2
Manuel Nebreda  as Cliente 3
Sebastian Elices  as Cliente 4
Resu Vigalondo  as Cliente 5
Dolores Gonzalez  as Cliente 6
Alejandro Tejerías  as Cliente 7 (as Alejandro Tejeria)
Patricia Maldonado  as Cliente 8
Javier Sanchez De La Cima  as Niño 1

See also
 List of Spanish Academy Award winners and nominees

External links

2003 films
2000s Spanish-language films
Spanish short films
Spanish black-and-white films
2000s musical films
Films directed by Nacho Vigalondo
2000s Spanish films